Rougier is a surname of French origin. People with the name include:
Adrien Rougier (1892-1984), French organist and composer
Henri Rougier (1876–1956), French racing cyclist, airplane pilot, and sporting motorist; winner of the first Monte Carlo Rally
Louis Rougier (1889–1982), French philosopher and historian
Richard Rougier (1932–2007), judge of the High Court of England and Wales
Tony Rougier (born 1971), Trinidadian professional football player and coach